literally means star in Japanese. It may refer to:

Art

 Shijō school, a Japanese school of painting

Names 
 Emperor Shijō, the 87th Emperor of Japan, 
 a Japanese surname
 —a Japanese kuge family descended from the

Places 
 Shijō Street, one of east–west streets in the ancient capital of Heian-kyō, present-day Kyoto
 Train stations
 Shijō Station, a train station on the Kyoto Municipal Subway Karasuma Line in Shimogyō-ku, Kyoto
 Gion-Shijō Station, a train station on the Keihan Main Line in Higashiyama-ku, Kyoto, formerly known as Shijō Station